James Block Zagel (born March 4, 1941) is an inactive Senior United States district judge of the United States District Court for the Northern District of Illinois and a novelist.

Early life and education 

Born in Chicago, Illinois, to Jewish parents, Zagel is the son of Samuel S. Zagel (1905–1999), a native of Warsaw, Poland who had immigrated to Chicago in 1915, and Ethel Samuels Zagel (1911–1986). Zagel earned a Bachelor of Arts degree from the University of Chicago in 1962 and a Master of Arts degree from the University of Chicago in the same year. He then earned a Juris Doctor from Harvard Law School in 1965.

Professional career 

Zagel began his career as an assistant state's attorney in Cook County, Illinois, from 1965 until 1969. He then served as an assistant attorney general for the State of Illinois from 1969 until 1977. Concurrent to the job as assistant attorney general, Zagel ran the Criminal Justice Division in the attorney general's office from 1970 until 1977, and he also served as chief prosecuting attorney for the Illinois Judicial Inquiry Board from 1973 until 1975. In 1977, Zagel became executive director of the Illinois Law Enforcement Commission, a post he held until 1979. From 1979 until 1980, Zagel was the director of the Illinois Department of Revenue. From 1980 until joining the federal bench in 1987, Zagel was the director of the Illinois State Police.

Federal judicial service

Judicial appointments

Zagel was a finalist for a federal judgeship in 1985, but was not chosen. On February 2, 1987, President Reagan nominated Zagel to be a judge on the United States District Court for the Northern District of Illinois. The United States Senate confirmed Zagel on April 21, 1987 and he received his commission on April 22, 1987. He took senior status on October 21, 2016. From 2008 to 2015, Zagel served a seven-year term on the FISA Court.

Trial history

Zagel has presided over many high-profile trials, including:

 the "Family Secrets" trial, which resulted in the convictions of multiple members of the Chicago Outfit, including Joseph Lombardo, James Marcello and Frank Calabrese, Sr.  
 a lawsuit by atheists against the community of Zion, Illinois, to get the town to remove all references to God from the town's official seal
 hearing federal criminal charges against Illinois power broker William Cellini
 one of two criminal trials of Tony Rezko

In April 2009, it was announced that Zagel would preside over the federal corruption trial of former Illinois Governor Rod Blagojevich and his brother, Robert Blagojevich. The judge refused to let Blagojevich go to Costa Rica to participate in the show, I'm A Celebrity, Get Me Out Of Here, saying Blagojevich needed to prepare a good defense for his upcoming trial and focus on the reality of the current situation. The former governor's wife Patti Blagojevich went instead. In August 2010, jury deliberations began in the Blagojevich trial. Rod Blagojevich was convicted on one charge, of lying to the Federal Bureau of Investigation, with a hung jury on 22 other charges. He was retried in June 2011, with Zagel presiding, and the jury returned a guilty verdict on 17 of the remaining counts, including those pertaining to the Obama Senate seat. On December 7, 2011, Zagel sentenced former Illinois Governor Rod Blagojevich to 14 years in federal prison.

Other interests 

Zagel had roles in two major motion pictures. He played a Chicago judge in the 1989 movie, Music Box, and a physician in the 1991 movie, Homicide, written and directed by David Mamet. Zagel performs in motion pictures under his stage name of J.S. Block. In 2002, Zagel published a novel titled Money to Burn, a fictional thriller about a plot to rob the Federal Reserve Bank.

Personal life 

Zagel and his first wife, Chicago Tribune investigative reporter Pam Zekman, divorced in 1975.

References

Sources
 

1941 births
Living people
American people of Polish-Jewish descent
Harvard Law School alumni
Judges of the United States District Court for the Northern District of Illinois
State cabinet secretaries of Illinois
United States district court judges appointed by Ronald Reagan
20th-century American judges
University of Chicago alumni
Writers from Chicago
Judges of the United States Foreign Intelligence Surveillance Court
21st-century American judges